Black heel and palm is a skin condition characterized by a sudden shower of minute, black, punctate macules occurring most often on the posterior edge of the plantar surface of one or both heels.

See also 
 Skin lesion
 List of cutaneous conditions

References 

Skin conditions resulting from physical factors